The Vásquez House, also known as Vásquez Adobe, is a historic two-story adobe building located at 546 Dutra Street in Monterey, California. It was occupied by Dolores a sister of Tiburcio Vásquez (1835–1875), who was a Californio bandido that was active in California from 1854 to 1874. The building is listed as a California Historical Landmark #351. It is owned by the City of Monterey, which uses it as the administrative office of its Park and Recreation Department.

History

Vásquez House, also known as Vasquez Adobe, and Casa Vasquez, was originally a one-story adobe when Tiburcio Vásquez's mother, María Guadalupe Cantúa, bought it in 1834 from the chief of police, Luis Placencia, who was also the town blacksmith. Tiburcio Vásquez was a Californio bandido that was active in California from 1854 to 1874. Tiburcio Vásquez was born in the home on April 10, 1835, and spent his childhood there.

The front had a covered patio with two doors that opened directly into the rooms. Each room had a back door that opened into the yard behind it.

According to the City of Monterey:

The Vásquez House on Dutra Street is located directly across the street from Colton Hall at 570 Pacific Street and near the old county jail. Colton Hall is a government building and museum. It was the site of California's first constitutional convention in 1849.

The Vásquez house has been modified over the years, but is still located in its original location at 546 Dutra Street, Monterey, California. The adobe was remodeled in 1925 with a second story addition made of wood and a ground floor addition.

According to the Monterey Research website:

Historic preservation

The Vásquez House is a landmark that the city of Monterey was determined should not disappear.
The historic house became the 351 California Historical Landmark on October 8, 1939.

On June 22, 1949, Monterey passed an ordinance to authorize the purchase of the Vásquez House. The city purchased the building for $20,000. The city remodeled the building after purchasing it in 1949. The city's Recreation & Community Services Department has operated from the building since 1951.

The building was retrofitted in 1997 for earthquake preparedness with some historic areas of the building restored. In 2012, the city provided ADA compliant parking for the City Hall and the Vásquez House on Dutra Street for $62,000.

See also
 California Historical Landmarks in Monterey County
 Monterey State Historic Park
 List of the oldest buildings in California

References

External links 
Office of Historic Preservation Vásquez House
Office of Historic Preservation, Monterey
Historic Buildings
California Historical Landmark 351

 

History of Monterey County, California
California Historical Landmarks
Adobe buildings and structures in California
Buildings and structures in Monterey County, California
Monterey, California
Buildings and structures in California
Buildings and structures in Monterey, California
Museums in Monterey County, California
Houses in Monterey County, California
Historic house museums in California
History of the Monterey Bay Area